Júlíus Magnússon (born 28 June 1998) is an Icelandic footballer who plays as a midfielder for Icelandic club Víkingur Reykjavík and the Iceland national team.

Club career
He rejoined Víkingur Reykjavík before the 2019 season, having played youth football for SC Heerenveen from 2015 after transferring from Víkingur.

International career
Júlíus made his international debut for Iceland on 9 June 2022 in a friendly match against San Marino.

References

External links
 

1998 births
Living people
Julius Magnusson
Julius Magnusson
Julius Magnusson
Julius Magnusson
Association football midfielders
Julius Magnusson